Amor perdido (Lost Love) is a 1951 Mexican drama film directed by Miguel Morayta and starring Amalia Aguilar and Víctor Junco. The plot is inspired by the famous bolero of the same name by Pedro Flores.

Plot
A young rumba dancer named Amalia (Amalia Aguilar), is supported by her friend, a young composer named Ernesto (Tito Novaro) to become a cabaret dancer. She meets and falls in love with the gangster Luis (Victor Junco). She has an accident on her face caused by the jealous lover of Luis, Celia (Yadira Jiménez), and has to wear a maskso she decides to leave without telling anyone. The gangster discovers her dancing in a cabaret and decides to kill her, not knowing the reason for her disappearance.

Cast
 Amalia Aguilar ... Amalia
 Víctor Junco ... Luis
 Tito Novaro ... Ernesto
 Yadira Jiménez ... Celia
 María Victoria
 María Luisa Landín

References

External links
 

1951 films
Mexican black-and-white films
Rumberas films
1950s Spanish-language films
Mexican drama films
1951 drama films
1950s Mexican films